New Hope Baptist Church may refer to:

New Hope Baptist Church (Newark, New Jersey), church where Whitney Houston began singing in her teens; her funeral was held there on February 18, 2012, exactly one week after her death.
New Hope Baptist Church (Beatrice, Alabama), listed on the National Register of Historic Places in Monroe County, Alabama
New Hope Baptist Church, Romulus, Alabama, located in Tuscaloosa County, Alabama
 New Hope Baptist Church, Boston, Massachusetts, housed in the former Tremont Street Methodist Episcopal Church building
New Hope Baptist Church (Chickasha, Oklahoma), listed on the National Register of Historic Places in Grady County, Oklahoma
New Hope Baptist Church (Denver, Colorado), a church located at 3701 Colorado Boulevard in Denver, Colorado